The 1998 Pepsi Southern 500, the 49th running of the event, was a NASCAR Winston Cup Series race held on September 6, 1998 at Darlington Raceway in Darlington, South Carolina. Contested at 367 laps on the 1.366 mile (2.198 km) speedway, it was the twenty-fourth race of the 1998 NASCAR Winston Cup Series season. Jeff Gordon of Hendrick Motorsports won the race. His fourth consecutive Southern 500 victory.

Top 10 results

Race statistics
 Time of race: 3:36:21
 Average Speed: 
 Pole Speed: 168.879
 Cautions: 2 for 16 laps
 Margin of Victory: 3.631 sec
 Lead changes: 12
 Percent of race run under caution: 4.4%         
 Average green flag run: 117 laps

References

Pepsi Southern 500
Pepsi Southern 500
Pepsi Southern 500
NASCAR races at Darlington Raceway